The 2021 season was Kelantan's 76th year in their history and third season in the Malaysia Premier League since 2019 following relegation 2018 season. Along with the league, the club will also compete in the Malaysia Cup.

Events
On 14 January 2021, the club announced Marco Ragini as Kelantan head coach.

On 13 February 2021, Natanael Siringo Ringo signed a one-year contract with the club.

17 February 2021, three new foreign players joined the club. Mario Arqués, Jack Hindle and Christos Intzidis.

On 5 May 2021, two players from the club have been tested positive for COVID-19 before league match against Selangor II.

On 24 June 2021, Zubir Azmi signed a contract with Kelantan from Sabah.

On 11 August 2021, the club won 3–1 over Kelantan United.

Squad

Technical staff

Competitions

Malaysia Premier League

League table

Results by round

Matches

Malaysia Cup

Group stage

Statistics

Appearances and goals

|-
! colspan="10" style="background:#dcdcdc; text-align:center"| Goalkeepers

|-
! colspan="16" style="background:#dcdcdc; text-align:center"| Defenders

|-
! colspan="16" style="background:#dcdcdc; text-align:center"| Midfielders

|-
! colspan="16" style="background:#dcdcdc; text-align:center"| Forwards

|-
! colspan="16" style="background:#dcdcdc; text-align:center"| Players transferred out during the season

|-

See also
 2021 Kelantan United F.C. season

References

2021
2021
Kelantan
Kelantan F.C.